In music, Op. 45 stands for Opus number 45. Compositions that are assigned this number include:

 Beach – Piano Concerto
 Berkeley – A Dinner Engagement
 Brahms – A German Requiem
 Britten – The Little Sweep
 Chopin – Prelude No. 25
 Fauré – Piano Quartet No. 2
 Grieg – Violin Sonata No. 3
 Kabalevsky – Piano Sonata No. 2
 Liebermann – The Picture of Dorian Gray
 Madetoja – The Ostrobothnians
 Mendelssohn – Cello Sonata No. 1
 Rachmaninoff – Symphonic Dances
 Rautavaara – Piano Concerto No. 1
 Saint-Saëns – Le Déluge
 Schumann – Romanzen & Balladen volume I (3 songs)
 Sibelius – The Dryad
 Tamberg – Cyrano de Bergerac
 Tchaikovsky – Capriccio Italien